Aegires citrinus is a species of sea slug, a nudibranch, a marine, opisthobranch gastropod mollusk in the family Aegiridae.

Distribution
This species was described from New Caledonia. It is common in Eastern Australia and known from the Philippines. Aegris citrinus has also been found at Cabilao Island, Philippines.

Description 
Aegris Citrinus is a nudibranch whose length averages about 14 mm. Its coloration may be translucent, white, or a bright yellow. This depends on the sponges it eats.

References

Aegiridae
Gastropods described in 1930